Deh-e Asgar or Deh Asgar may refer to:
 Deh-e Asgar, Markazi
 Deh-e Asgar, Yazd